Frederick Arthur Monk (July 16, 1884 – February 16, 1954) was a Quebec politician.

Background

He was born in Montreal on July 16, 1884 and was the son of Frederick Debartzch Monk.

Member of the legislature

He was elected as the Action libérale nationale (ALN) candidate to the Legislative Assembly of Quebec in 1935 in the district of Jacques-Cartier.  He refused to join the newly formed Union Nationale and ran as an Independent candidate in 1936.  He was defeated.

Death

He died on February 16, 1954.

References

1884 births
1954 deaths
Action libérale nationale MNAs
Politicians from Montreal
Burials at Mount Royal Cemetery